John Byron Shannon (born January 18, 1965) is a former American football defensive lineman. He played two seasons for the Chicago Bears.

References 

1965 births
Living people
American football defensive ends
Kentucky Wildcats football players
Chicago Bears players
London Monarchs players